Tawana Vicenia Brawley (born December 15, 1971) is an African-American woman from New York who gained notoriety in November 1987 at age 15 when she accused four white men of kidnapping and raping her over a 4-day period.
On November 28, 1987, Brawley was found in a trash bag after having been missing for four days from her home in Wappingers Falls, New York. She had racial slurs written on her body and was covered in feces. Brawley accused four white men of having raped her. The charges received widespread national attention in part because of the appalling condition in which she had been left, her young age, and the professional status of the persons she accused of the crime (including police officers and a prosecuting attorney). Brawley's advisers—Al Sharpton, Alton H. Maddox, and C. Vernon Mason—also helped in bringing the case to national prominence. After hearing evidence, a grand jury concluded in October 1988 that Brawley had not been the victim of a forcible sexual assault, and that she herself may have created the appearance of such an attack. Steven Pagones, the New York prosecutor whom Brawley had accused as being one of her assailants, later successfully sued Brawley, and her three advisers, for defamation.

Brawley received considerable support from the African-American community. Some academics have suggested that Brawley was victimized by biased reporting that had credited racial stereotypes. The mainstream media's coverage drew heated criticism from the African-American press, and from many black leaders who professed to believe the teenager and her narrative. The grand jury's conclusions decreased support for Brawley and her advisers; Brawley's family have continued to assert that the allegations were true.

Origins of the case 
On November 28, 1987, Tawana Brawley, who had been missing for four days from her home in Wappingers Falls, New York, was found seemingly unconscious and unresponsive, lying in a garbage bag several feet from an apartment where she had once lived. Her clothing was torn and burned, her body smeared with feces. She was taken to the emergency room, where the words "KKK", "nigger", and "bitch" were discovered written on her torso with charcoal.

A detective from the sheriff's juvenile aid bureau, among others, was summoned to interview Brawley, but she remained unresponsive. The family requested a black officer, which the police department was able to provide. Brawley, described as having an "extremely spacey" look on her face, communicated with this officer with nods of the head, shrugs of the shoulder, and written notes. The interview lasted 20 minutes, during which she uttered only one word: "neon". Through gestures and writing, however, she indicated she had been raped repeatedly in a wooded area by six white men, at least one of whom, she said, was a police officer.

A sexual assault kit was administered, and police began building a case. Brawley provided no names or descriptions of her assailants. She later told others that there had been no rape, only other kinds of sexual abuse. Forensic tests found no evidence that a sexual assault of any kind had occurred. There was no evidence of exposure to elements, which would have been expected in a victim held for several days in the woods at a time when the temperature dropped below freezing at night.

Public response

The initial public response to Brawley's story was mostly sympathetic. Bill Cosby offered a $25,000 reward for information on the case, while Don King pledged $100,000 toward Brawley's education. In December 1987, more than one thousand people, including Nation of Islam leader Louis Farrakhan, marched through the streets of Newburgh, New York, in support of Brawley.

Brawley's claims in the case captured headlines across the country. Public rallies were held denouncing the incident. When civil rights activist Al Sharpton, with attorneys Alton H. Maddox and C. Vernon Mason, began handling Brawley's publicity, the case quickly became highly controversial. Sharpton, Maddox, and Mason generated a national media sensation. The three said that officials all the way up to the state government were trying to cover up defendants in the case because they were white. They further suggested that the Ku Klux Klan, the Irish Republican Army, and the Mafia had conspired with the U.S. government in the alleged cover up. 

Harry Crist Jr., a police officer who committed suicide shortly after the period when Brawley was allegedly held captive, became a suspect in the case. Steven Pagones, an assistant district attorney in Dutchess County, New York, attempted to establish an alibi for Crist, stating that he had been with Crist during that period of time. Sharpton, Maddox, and Mason then said that Crist and Pagones were two of the rapists. They also accused Pagones of being a racist. Based on Crist's suicide note, The New York Times reported that he killed himself because his girlfriend ended their relationship shortly before his death, and because he was upset that he was unable to become a state trooper.

The mainstream media's coverage drew heated criticism from the African-American press and leaders for its treatment of the teenager. They cited the leaking and publication of photos taken of her at the hospital, and the revelation of her name despite her being underage. In addition, critics were concerned that Brawley had been left in the custody of her mother, stepfather, and advisers, rather than being given protection by the state. In an opinion piece in The New York Times, Martha Miles and Richard L. Madden wrote:
State law provides that if a child appears to have been sexually molested, then the Child Protective Services Agency is supposed to take jurisdiction and custody of that child. Now, Tawana Brawley was 15 at the time of the incident. If that had been done... early on, the agency would have given her psychiatric attention and preserved evidence of rape...

Sharpton's former aide, Perry McKinnon, said that Sharpton, Maddox, and Mason were unconcerned with Brawley, and were using the case to “tak[e] over the town,” as he had heard Sharpton say that the case could make him and Brawley's other two advisers “the biggest niggers in New York.” In June 1988, at the height of the controversy surrounding the case, a poll showed a gap of 34 percentage points between blacks (51%) and whites (85%) on the question of whether Brawley was lying.

Grand jury hearings
Under the authority of New York State Attorney General Robert Abrams, a grand jury was called to hear evidence. On October 6, 1988, the grand jury released its 170-page report that concluded Brawley had not been abducted, assaulted, raped, or sodomized, as Brawley and her advisers said. The report further concluded that the allegations against Pagones were false and had no basis in fact. Before issuing the report, the grand jury heard from 180 witnesses, saw 250 exhibits, and recorded more than 6,000 pages of testimony.

In the decision, the grand jury noted many problems with Brawley's story. Among these were that the rape kit results did not indicate sexual assault. Additionally, despite saying she had been held captive outdoors for days, Brawley was not suffering from hypothermia, was well-nourished, and appeared to have brushed her teeth recently. Despite her clothing being charred, there were no burns on her body. Although a shoe she was wearing was cut through, Brawley had no injuries to her foot. The racial epithets written on her were upside down, which led to suspicion that Brawley had written the words. Testimony from her schoolmates indicated she had attended a local party during the time of her supposed abduction. One witness claimed to have observed Brawley's climbing into the garbage bag. The feces on her body were identified as coming from her neighbor's dog. Brawley never testified, despite a subpoena ordering her to do so.

On June 6, 1988, Tawana's mother, Glenda Brawley, was sentenced to 30 days in prison, and fined $250 for contempt of court for refusing to testify at the grand jury hearing. She evaded arrest by hiding in churches, with the police failing to arrest her, arguing it would lead to violence. The Brawley family then fled New York state, travelling around the country for several months before settling in Virginia Beach.

Possible motives
Much of the grand jury evidence pointed to a possible motive for Brawley's falsifying the incident: trying to avoid violent punishment from her mother and particularly her stepfather, Ralph King. Witnesses testified that Glenda Brawley had previously beaten her daughter for running away, and for spending nights with boys. King had a history of violence that included stabbing his first wife 14 times, which later escalated into him shooting and killing her. There was considerable evidence that King could and would violently attack Brawley: when Brawley had been arrested on a shoplifting charge the previous May, King attempted to beat her for the offense while at the police station. Witnesses also described King as having talked about his stepdaughter in a sexualizing manner. 

On the day of her alleged disappearance, Brawley had skipped school to visit her boyfriend, Todd Buxton, who was serving a six-month jail sentence. When Buxton's mother (with whom she had visited Buxton in jail) urged her to get home before she got in trouble, Brawley told her, "I'm already in trouble." She described how angry King was over a previous incident of her staying out late.

Neighbors also told the grand jury that in February they overheard Glenda Brawley saying to King, “You shouldn't have took the money because after it all comes out, they're going to find out the truth.” Another neighbor heard Mrs. Brawley say, “They know we're lying, and they're going to find out and come and get us.”

In April 1989, New York Newsday published claims by a boyfriend of Brawley's, Daryl Rodriguez, that she had told him the story was fabricated, with help from her mother, in order to avert the wrath of her stepfather. Writing about the case in a 2004 book on perceptions of racial violence, sociologist Jonathan Markovitz concluded that "it is reasonable to suggest that Brawley's fear and the kinds of suffering that she must have gone through must have been truly staggering if they were enough to force her to resort to cutting her hair, covering herself in feces, and crawling into a garbage bag."

Aftermath
 The case highlighted mistrust of legal institutions within the black community. Legal scholar Patricia J. Williams wrote in 1991 that the teenager "has been the victim of some unspeakable crime. No matter how she got there. No matter who did it to her—and even if she did it to herself." These comments aroused controversy as well; Daniel A. Farber and Suzanna Sherry responded to Williams in their book Beyond All Reason: The Radical Assault on Truth in American Law, writing "The radical multiculturalists seem unable or unwilling to differentiate between Brawley's fantasized rape and another woman's real one. Indifference to the distinction between fact and fiction minimizes real suffering by implying that it is no worse than imagined or self-inflicted suffering." 

Reviewing Spike Lee's film Do the Right Thing, cultural critic Stanley Crouch wrote negatively of, "men like Vernon Mason who sold out a good reputation in a cynical bid for political power by pimping real victims of racism in order to smoke-screen Tawana Brawley’s lies."  On May 21, 1990, Alton H. Maddox was indefinitely suspended by the Appellate Division of the State Supreme Court in Brooklyn after failing to appear before a disciplinary hearing to answer allegations regarding his conduct in the Brawley case.

In 1998, Pagones was awarded $345,000 through a lawsuit for defamation of character that he had brought against Sharpton, Maddox and Mason; Pagones initially sought $395 million. The jury found Sharpton liable for making seven defamatory statements about Pagones, Maddox for two and Mason for one. The jury deadlocked on four of the 22 statements over which Pagones had sued, and it found eight statements to be non-defamatory. In a later interview, Pagones said the turmoil caused by the accusations of Brawley and her advisers had cost him his first marriage and much personal grief.

Pagones also sued Brawley. She defaulted by not appearing at the trial, and the judge ordered her to pay Pagones damages of $185,000. The $65,000 judgment levied against Al Sharpton was paid for him in 2001 by supporters, including attorney Johnnie Cochran and businessman Earl G. Graves, Jr. In December 2012, the New York Post reported that Maddox had paid his judgment of $97,000 and Mason was making payments on the $188,000 which he owed. Brawley reportedly had not made any payments. The following month a court ordered her wages garnished to pay Pagones.

In a 1997 appearance, Brawley maintained she did not invent the story; she still had supporters. In November 2007, Brawley's stepfather and mother, in a 20th-anniversary feature for the New York Daily News, contended the attack happened. "How could we make this up and take down the state of New York? We're just regular people," Glenda Brawley said. They said they had asked New York State Attorney General Andrew Cuomo and Governor Eliot Spitzer to reopen the case. They also said that Brawley would speak at any legal proceedings. As of 2013, Brawley works as a nurse in rural Virginia, under a new name. Influenced by her interactions with Louis Farrakhan (who supported her claims), Brawley converted to Islam during the trial, and according to the Daily News she remains an active member of the Nation of Islam.

In popular culture
Spike Lee's 1989 film Do the Right Thing features a shot of graffiti which says "Tawana told the truth."
Brawley appeared alongside Sharpton in the music video for Public Enemy's "Fight the Power", which was directed and produced by Lee.
The 1990 Law & Order episode "Out of the Half-Light" is a fictionalized retelling of the Brawley case. The case is also discussed in the 2014 Law & Order: Special Victims Unit episode "Criminal Stories".
Brawley is referenced by Lisa "Left Eye" Lopes in the song "His Story" from TLC's debut album Ooooooohhh... On the TLC Tip (1992).
Joyce Carol Oates's 2015 novel The Sacrifice is a fictionalized account of the Brawley case.
In 2018, the case was covered in Fox Nation's Scandalous.

See also

A Rape on Campus
Crystal Mangum
Domestic violence
Duke lacrosse case
False accusation of rape
Marissa Alexander case
Racial hoax

References

External links 
  (another view of Brawley's appearance in Brooklyn in 1997)
 Pagones v. Maddox, et al. – Decision of the Supreme Court of New York, County of Dutchess 
 Tawana Brawley topic page, The New York Times
 "The Tawana Brawley Story", New York Times video
 Al Sharpton 1988 Poughkeepsie march photograph by photographer/filmmaker Clay Walker
 Booknotes interview with M.A. Farber on Outrage: The Story Behind the Tawana Brawley Hoax, September 16, 1990.
 Tawana Brawley Grand Jury Report

1987 crimes in the United States
1987 hoaxes
1987 in New York (state)
African-American history of New York (state)
African-American-related controversies
False allegations of sex crimes
History of Dutchess County, New York
Hoaxes in the United States
Mass media-related controversies in the United States
Post–civil rights era in African-American history
Racial hoaxes
Wappinger, New York
1988 in New York (state)